Robin Hood of the Range is a 1943 American Western film directed by William Berke and written by Betty Burbridge. The film stars Charles Starrett, Arthur Hunnicutt, Kay Harris, Kenneth MacDonald, Johnny Mitchell and Hal Price. The film was released on July 29, 1943, by Columbia Pictures.

Plot

Cast          
Charles Starrett as Steve Marlowe
Arthur Hunnicutt as Arkansas
Kay Harris as Julie Marlowe
Kenneth MacDonald as Henry Marlowe
Johnny Mitchell as Ned Harding 
Hal Price as Sheriff
Edward Peil Sr. as Grady 
Frank LaRue as Carter
Bud Osborne as Thompson
Stanley Brown as Santana
Jimmy Wakely as Jimmy
Johnny Bond as Johnny
Scotty Harrel as Scotty

References

External links
 

1943 films
American Western (genre) films
1943 Western (genre) films
Columbia Pictures films
Films directed by William A. Berke
American black-and-white films
1940s English-language films
1940s American films